Marianne Schläger (born 22 November 1920) was an Austrian athlete. She competed in the women's shot put and the women's discus throw at the 1948 Summer Olympics.

References

External links
 

1920 births
Possibly living people
Athletes (track and field) at the 1948 Summer Olympics
Austrian female shot putters
Austrian female discus throwers
Olympic athletes of Austria
Place of birth missing